CJCB-DT (channel 4) is a television station in Sydney, Nova Scotia, Canada, part of the CTV Television Network. Owned and operated by network parent Bell Media, the station maintains studios on George Street/Trunk 22 in Sydney, and its transmitter is located on McMillan Road southwest of the city.

CJCB-DT is part of the CTV Atlantic regional system in the Maritimes, carrying the same programming as sister station CJCH-DT in Halifax at all times, except for some commercials and an annual telethon. On August 1, 2012, CJCB-DT (as CJCB-TV) became the only terrestrial broadcaster in the market, as the CBC repeater station, CBIT-TV, was closed the previous evening.

History
CJCB-TV was the first television station to broadcast in Nova Scotia, when it signed on for the first time on October 9, 1954, beating CBHT-TV in Halifax by two months. It was originally a CBC affiliate. It joined the CBC's national microwave network in 1958, linking all stations between it and British Columbia. Prior to the microwave connection, programming was either from live local studio productions or kinescope 16mm film copies of CBC network shows. The station fully converted to NTSC colour production in 1975, though it was able to transmit colour programming originated through the network starting in October 1966. It continues to broadcast an NTSC analogue terrestrial over-the-air signal, and does not currently have digital ATSC HDTV capabilities.

CJCB was originally owned by the Nathanson family, that also owned CJCB radio at the time. CHUM Limited, owner of CJCH-TV, bought CJCB-TV in 1971 and applied to the Canadian Radio-television and Telecommunications Commission (CRTC) to switch it to the CTV network. The switch occurred on September 26, 1972, when the CBC put CBIT-TV on the air in Sydney. After the switch occurred, it immediately joined the newly formed Atlantic Television Network (ATV), CHUM's network of CTV affiliates in the Maritimes.

As part of CBIT's licence, it was not allowed to show local advertising, leaving CJCB with a monopoly in local advertising. CJCB's monopoly was reaffirmed in a CRTC decision in 1985 that denied a CBIT request to enter that part of the market. CHUM continued to own CJCB-TV until February 26, 1997 (with CRTC approval given on August 28, 1997), when it swapped the entire ATV group to Baton Broadcasting in a deal that saw Baton become majority owner of CTV.

Programming
One of Canada's longest-running TV programs, Mass for Shut-ins, originates at CJCB-TV; it premiered on March 3, 1963, and is still on the air today. It is telecast across the CTV Atlantic system.

Shantytown was another TV program that originated at CJCB-TV; it was aimed at children and ran from 1978 to 1984. Like Mass for Shut-ins, it was also telecast to all three Maritime provinces. Characters include Sam the Sailor, Katie the Craft Lady, Marjorie the Music Lady and their puppet friends.

Technical information

Subchannel

Analogue-to-digital conversion
The station ceased broadcasting in analogue on January 28, 2022, and began broadcasting in digital on the same date.

Transmitters

The station also has rebroadcast transmitters in the following communities:

The station originally operated CJCB-TV-4 channel 8 in New Glasgow, until that transmitter closed in late 2010.

On February 11, 2016, Bell Media applied for its regular license renewals, which included applications to delete a long list of transmitters, including CJCB-TV-5. Bell Media's rationale for deleting these analog repeaters is below:

"We are electing to delete these analog transmitters from the main licence with which they are associated. These analog transmitters generate no incremental revenue, attract little to no viewership given the growth of BDU or DTH subscriptions and are costly to maintain, repair or replace. In addition, none of the highlighted transmitters offer any programming that differs from the main channels. The Commission has determined that broadcasters may elect to shut down transmitters but will lose certain regulatory privileges (distribution on the basic service, the ability to request simultaneous substitution) as noted in Broadcasting Regulatory Policy CRTC 2015-24, Over-the-air transmission of television signals and local programming. We are fully aware of the loss of these regulatory privileges as a result of any transmitter shutdown."

At the same time, Bell Media applied to convert the licenses of CTV 2 Atlantic (formerly ASN) and CTV 2 Alberta (formerly ACCESS) from satellite-to-cable undertakings into television stations without transmitters (similar to cable-only network affiliates in the United States), and to reduce the level of educational content on CTV 2 Alberta.

On July 30, 2019, Bell Media was granted permission to close down an additional transmitter as part of Broadcasting Decision CRTC 2019-268. The transmitter for CJCB-TV-3 will be shut down by December 3, 2021.

References

External links
CTV Atlantic

JCB-DT
JCB-DT
Television channels and stations established in 1954
Mass media in the Cape Breton Regional Municipality
1954 establishments in Nova Scotia